Ode is a ballet-oratorio by Nicolas Nabokov, the first major musical work by the composer. It was created for Serge Diaghilev's Ballets Russes, with choreography by Léonide Massine, a scenario by Boris Kochno (based on verses of Mikhail Lomonosov Evening meditation on God's majesty on the occasion of the great northern lights), stage design by Pavel Tchelitchew, and light projections by Pierre Charbonnier. The ballet was premiered on June 6, 1928 in Paris, at the Sarah Bernhardt Theater. The orchestra was conducted by Roger Désormière. 

 Apprentice (Poet and Glare of Light) – Serge Lifar
 Nature – Irina Bellin (Beliankina, niece of Igor Stravinsky)
 Participants in the Festival of Nature – Felia Doubrovska, Alice Nikitina, Alexandra Danilova, Léonide Massine, Nikolai Efimov, Konstantin Cherkas, Leon Woizikovsky.

Literature
 Norton L. Léonid Massine and 20th Century Ballet. McFarland & Company, 2004

1928 ballet premieres
Ballets by Léonide Massine
Ballets Russes productions
Ballets based on literature